The 2009–10 Indian cricket season included the following series:

 Australia in India (7 ODIs)
 Sri Lanka in India (3 TESTS, 2 T20s, 5 ODIs)
 South Africa in India (2 TESTS, 3 ODIs)

Australia in India

Australia played seven ODIs in India from 25 October to 11 November 2009. The seven ODIs will complement the Test series that took place between the two nations in 2008 in India.

Sri Lanka in India 

The tour will begin with a practice match for the Sri Lankans against Indian Board President's XI starting November 11. The first test will begin on November 16 and the tour will conclude on December 27, with the last ODI. In all, the tour will include one First Class match, three Tests, two T20Is & five ODIs.

South Africa in India

South Africa played two Test and three ODIs.

References

Indian cricket seasons from 2000–01
2009 in Indian cricket
2010 in Indian cricket